The 2022–23 PHF season is the eighth ice hockey season of the Premier Hockey Federation (PHF) – known as the National Women's Hockey League during its first six seasons (2015–2021).

League business 

The PHF decided not to hold a draft this year.

Montreal expansion 
The long-expected Montreal Force expansion franchise was announced in July and the team name, colors and logo were revealed in August. The team will not have an official home arena during the 2022–23 season but will instead play home games across the province of Quebec, with expected stops in Montreal, Gatineau, Quebec City, Rimouski, Rivière-du-Loup, Saint-Jérôme, and Sept-Îles, Quebec, among others.

International players 
A record twenty international players signed as roster players in the PHF for the 2022–23 season. Of the international players, six are from Finland, five are from Czechia, four are from Sweden, two are from Austria, two are from Hungary, and one is from Switzerland. Signed as a practice player rather than to the main roster, Iveta Klimášová of the Buffalo Beauts is from Slovakia.

An additional four players are North American-born but hold multiple citizenship and have represented nations outside of North America in international competition (listed with nations of citizenship): Taylor Baker (Canada/Hungary). Janka Hlinka (Slovakia/United States), Leah Lum (Canada/China), and Lenka Serdar (Czechia/United States).

Player nationalities

 Austria: Antonia Matzka, Janine Weber
 China: Leah Lum
 Czechia: Denisa Křížová, Dominika Lásková, Kateřina Mrázová, Lenka Serdar, Aneta Tejralová, Tereza Vanišová 
 Finland: Anna Kilponen, Eveliina Mäkinen, Emma Nuutinen, Meeri Räisänen, Jenna Suokko, Minttu Tuominen
 Hungary: Taylor Baker, Réka Dabasi, Fanni Garát-Gasparics
 Slovakia: Janka Hlinka, Iveta Klimášová
 Sweden: Lovisa Berndtsson, Ebba Berglund, Ronja Mogren, Lovisa Selander
 Switzerland: Sarah Forster

Front office changes 

On May 17, 2022, the Minnesota Whitecaps announced that Jack Brodt, who co-founded the team in 2004, would take a position with NLTT Hockey, the company who bought the Whitecaps in the 2021–22 season.

On August 21, 2022, Chi-Yin Tse was named as the new general manager for the Whitecaps.

Coaching changes 

On May 9, 2022, Venla Hovi succeeded Ivo Mocek as head coach of the Metropolitan Riveters.  Mocek remains with the team as associate head coach.

On May 17, 2022, Ronda Engelhardt took over as sole head coach of the Whitecaps.

Regular season

Standings

Schedule
The 2022–23 season schedule was published on September 19, 2022.

All times in Eastern Standard Time (UTC−05:00); exception of November 5–6, 2022, which are in Eastern Daylight Time (UTC−04:00).

News and notes 
December 10, 2022: Boston Pride goaltender Corinne Schroeder set a new PHF single season record for shutouts, recording her fourth shutout in just seven starts for the first place Pride.
December 11, 2022: Boston Pride team captain Jillian Dempsey tied a PHF record with six points on Sunday including her first career hat-trick to lead Boston to a 7–5 win versus Buffalo.

Player statistics

Scoring leaders
The following players led the league in regular season points at the completion of games played on March 5, 2023.

The following skaters were the top point scorers of teams not represented in the scoring leader table at the conclusion of games played March 5, 2023, noted with their overall league scoring rank:

Leading goaltenders
The following goaltenders led the league in regular season save percentage at the completion of games played on February 6, 2023, while playing at least 30% of games.

Awards and honors 
Player of the Month
 November 2022: Corinne Schroeder (BOS)
 December 2022: Brittany Howard (TOR)
 January 2023: Kennedy Marchment (CTW)
 February 2023: Loren Gabel (BOS)
 March 2023: Madison Packer (MET)

Three Stars of the Week
 November 5–6: 1. Corinne Schroeder (BOS), 2. Brittany Howard (TOR), 3. Élizabeth Giguère (BOS)
 November 18–20: 1. Sarah Bujold (MET), 2. Corinne Schroeder (BOS), 3. Leah Lum (TOR)
 November 26–27: 1. Jade Downie-Landry (MON), 2. Ann-Sophie Bettez (MON), 3. Fanni Garát-Gasparics (MET)
 December 3–4: 1. Kennedy Marchment (CTW), 2. Minttu Tuominen (MET), 3. Sydney Brodt (MIN)
 December 9–11: 1. Jillian Dempsey (BOS), 2. Loren Gabel (BOS), 3. Brittany Howard (TOR)
 December 16–18: 1. Natalie Snodgrass (MIN), 2. Shiann Darkangelo (TOR), 3. Taylor Girard (CTW)
 January 6–8: 1. Taylor Girard (CTW), 2. Loren Gabel (BOS), 3. Elaine Chuli (TOR)
 January 14–15: 1. Allie Thunstrom (BOS), 2. Ann-Sophie Bettez (MON), 3. Jonna Albers (MIN)
 January 17–22: 1. Loren Gabel (BOS), 2. Kennedy Marchment (CTW), 3. Brittany Howard (TOR)
 February 3–6: 1. Loren Gabel (BOS), 2. Shiann Darkangelo (TOR), 3. Corinne Schroeder (BOS)
 February 11–12: 1. Tricia Deguire (MON), 2. Elaine Chuli (TOR), 3. Alexandra Labelle (MON)
 February 18–19: 1. Corinne Schroeder (BOS), 2. Samantha Ridgewell (BUF), 3. Michela Cava (TOR)
 February 24–26: 1. Madison Packer (MET), 2. Tereza Vanišová (TOR), 3. Justine Reyes (CTW)
 March 3–5: 1. Kennedy Marchment (CTW), 2. Sarah Bujold (MET), 3. Jillian Dempsey (BOS)
 March 10–12: 1. Madison Packer (MET), 2. Daryl Watts (TOR), 3. Abbie Ives (CTW)

Playoffs
The top four teams in the standings qualified for the Isobel Cup playoffs, which was held in two rounds.  The first round games were be a best-of-three series, hosted at the Bentley Arena in Waltham, Massachusetts and the Mattamy Athletic Centre at Maple Leaf Gardens in Toronto starting Friday, March 17, 2023.  The two semifinal winners will play a one-game championship final on Sunday, March 26, 2023, at Mullett Arena in Tempe, Arizona.

Bracket

Semifinals

(1) Boston Pride vs. (4)

(2) Toronto Six vs. (3)

Isobel Cup final

References

Gamesheets

External links 
 

2022-23 PHF season
2022-23 PHF season
2022–23 PHF season
PHF
PHF
PHF
PHF